Linda A. Peteanu is an American chemist who is a professor and head of the department of chemistry at Carnegie Mellon University. Her research considers the steady state and transient photophysics of conjugated molecules.

Early life and education 
Peteanu was an undergraduate student at Barnard College, where she completed a double major in chemistry and biochemistry. She served as editor of the Barnard Bulletin. She moved to the University of Chicago for her doctoral research, where she worked alongside Donald Levy on the development of electronic spectroscopy of molecular beams. She was a postdoctoral researcher at the University of California, Berkeley, using Raman spectroscopy to unravel photo-isomerization in rhodopsin.

Research and career 
Peteanu started her independent career at the Carnegie Mellon University in 1983. Her research considers the development and study of conjugated carbon-based materials for organic electronics. To optimize these systems, she makes use of various steady-state and spectroscopic probes. She has extensively developed Stark spectroscopy, a technique which enables the investigation of charge transfer and delocalisation. The technique applies an electric field to molecular thin films and examines the impact on absorption or emission. She has shown that the application of an applied electric field (e.g. those found in OLEDs) can quench the emission of the conjugated molecules, which impacts the efficiency of displays.

Peteanu has also investigated RNA splicing.  Peteanu tracks RNA splicing using förster resonance energy transfer and total internal reflection fluorescence microscopy. She also studies energy transfer in DNA-based dye arrays, looking to understand and exploit the energy-transfer properties of multi-chromophore systems. In 2017, Peteanu was appointed Head of the Department of Chemistry.

Selected publications

References 

Living people
Barnard College alumni
University of Chicago alumni
Carnegie Mellon University faculty
American women chemists
20th-century American chemists
21st-century American chemists
20th-century American women scientists
21st-century American women scientists
Year of birth missing (living people)